Wesley Chapel, Texas is an unincorporated community in Houston County, Texas, United States. It is located off Farm to Market Road 229, six miles from Crockett, Texas. It was settled after the American Civil War, and a school was built in 1897. A new Wesley Chapel school was built about 1/2 mile south in 1912. It last used in 1948 & was destroyed by a tornado in 1953.  Students in the area are zoned within the Latexo Independent School District.

References

Populated places in Houston County, Texas